Kyle Davies may refer to:
Kyle Davies (baseball) (born 1983), American baseball pitcher
Kyle Davies (soccer) (born 1989), American soccer player
Kyle Davies (businessperson), a founder of cryptocurrency hedge fund Three Arrows Capital in the 2010s

See also
Kylie Davies
Kyle Davis (disambiguation)
Carl Davies, British biathlete